Charles Martin (born November 3, 1969) is an author from the Southern United States.

Martin earned his B.A. in English from Florida State University and went on to receive an M.A. in Journalism and a Ph.D. in Communication from Regent University. He currently lives in Jacksonville, Florida  with his wife and three sons.

Works

Novels 

Awakening series:
 The Dead Don't Dance (2004)
 Maggie (2006)

Murphy Shepard series:
 The Water Keeper (2020)
 The Letter Keeper (2021)
 The Record Keeper (Expected publication 2022)

Stand-alones:
 Wrapped in Rain (2005)
 When Crickets Cry (2006)
 Chasing Fireflies: A Novel of Discovery (2007)
 Where the River Ends (2008)
 The Mountain Between Us (2010)
 Thunder and Rain (2012)
 Unwritten (2013)
 A Life Intercepted (2014)
 Water from My Heart (2015)
 Long Way Gone (2016)
 Send Down the Rain (2018)

Non-fiction 

 River Road (2015), memoirs
 What If It's True?: A Storyteller’s Journey with Jesus (2019), religion
 They Turned the World Upside Down: A Storyteller's Journey with Those Who Dared to Follow Jesus (2021), religion
 If the Tomb Is Empty: Why the Resurrection Means Anything Is Possible (Expected publication 2022), with Joby Martin, religion
 If the Tomb Is Empty Study Guide: Why the Resurrection Means Anything Is Possible (Expected publication 2022), with Joby Martin, religion

Adaptations 

 The Mountain Between Us (2017), film directed by Hany Abu-Assad, based on novel The Mountain Between Us

Bibliography

References

External links
 Official US site for Charles Martin
 Official UK site for Charles Martin
 Interview with Charles Martin
 

1969 births
Living people
Writers from Florida
Florida State University alumni
Regent University alumni